Reuben were an English three-piece musical group from Camberley, Surrey. Their music is a fusion of alternative rock and heavy metal, as their songs cover a variety of styles, ranging from heavy and upbeat, such as their 2005 single "Blamethrower" to slower, more melodic songs such as their 2004 single "Moving to Blackwater". The former style of song often featured  vocalist Jamie Lenman switching between shouting and whispering, a technique often used in heavy metal and post-hardcore music. The band performed in the UK underground music scene. Although they attracted a significant fanbase, Reuben never achieved mainstream success, but did chart four songs in the UK Singles Chart. Their highest charting single was 2004's "Freddy Kreuger", that reached UK No. 53.

In June 2008, Reuben entered a state of indefinite hiatus.  Fans were emailed by the band manager, making them aware of the hiatus, assuring them that this was not the end for Reuben.

History

1998-2000 Formation
The band formed in 1998 when singer/guitarist Jamie Lenman and bassist Jon Pearce originally played with producer Jason Wilson (formerly Wilcock) of Stakeout Studios on drums as Angel, sharing local stages with many bands, one of which would become Hundred Reasons. Between 1998 and 2000, Angel recorded and self-released a string of limited edition demos. The songs and artwork of one of these demos, Betrayed, was available to download via the band's website. Many Angel songs were used as b-sides to Reuben singles.

2000-2003: Line-up change and Pilot EP
In March 2000, they parted ways with Wilson, and Mark Lawton joined as drummer, with whom they wrote and recorded the Pilot EP, which was released in January 2001 on the Badmusic label after they changed their name to Reuben. The group decided to go ahead with recording the EP after they had won a battle of the bands in Bookham, Surrey, in front of a panel of 12-year-olds. Following the release of Pilot EP, Lawton left and was replaced by their final drummer, Guy Davis. The new line-up toured around the UK, and were the subject of a two-hour special on Zane Lowe's XFM Radio Show, despite not yet releasing an album.

2004: Racecar Is Racecar Backwards
Their debut album Racecar Is Racecar Backwards was released in June 2004 through Xtra Mile Recordings. Jason Wilson produced the album at Stakeout Studios which at the time was based in Chobham. It spawned the chart singles "Freddy Kreuger" and "Moving To Blackwater", and led to their nomination for a Kerrang! Award for Best British Newcomer. Their many singles were popular on the underground music scene, receiving airplay on MTV2.

2005-2006: Very Fast Very Dangerous
2005 saw the release of the band's second album, Very Fast Very Dangerous on Xtra Mile Recordings, spawning a further three singles, including the download-only "Blamethrower". The album received reasonable reviews, the BBC giving it a 4/5 rating, and many of the songs featured on this album were performed regularly by the band.

In September 2005, the band played a three-song live set on the Zane Lowe show on BBC Radio 1 in support of the then-upcoming album. The set featured a cover version of the Gorillaz song "Feel Good Inc.", as well as two songs from the second album, "Some Mothers Do 'Ave 'Em" and then upcoming single "Keep It to Yourself".

In September 2006, the band toured around the UK and Europe with Canadian punk band Billy Talent. This was the first time that Reuben played in Europe.

2006-2007: In Nothing We Trust
On 20 November 2006, the band returned to the studio to record their third album, In Nothing We Trust. It was produced by Sean Genockey with Jack Rushton in Livingstone Studios, London. The album featured three guest vocalists, Frank Turner, Hannah Clark (the singer from the Hampshire-based band, Arthur) and Paul Townsend (formerly of Hundred Reasons). Throughout recording the band uploaded short videos on YouTube for each day in the studio. The album was released on 25 June 2007 via Hideous Records.

Reuben were also featured on the Print Is Dead Vol. 1 project by the UK band Yourcodenameis:milo on the track "Captain of Lies".

The band released their first DVD, a double-disc offering named What Happens in Aldershot Stays in Aldershot, on 19 March 2007. The DVD featured both a documentary of life in the band and a full recording of the band's show at London's Mean Fiddler on 27 April 2006 (including an audio commentary).

On 13 January 2007, Reuben announced that they would be running their own label, Hideous Records in order to have more control over future releases. The video for the first single from their next album, "Blood, Bunny, Larkhall" was posted on their website on 7 May 2007. The track was released on 18 June 2007.

Their third album, In Nothing We Trust was released to critical acclaim, receiving 9/10 from Rocksound, 4/5 from Kerrang! and Q magazine and 8/10 from Hot Press. The second single from the album, "Deadly Lethal Ninja Assassin" (featuring Frank Turner of Million Dead fame) was released on 24 September. The band released a new track, "Christmas Is Awesome", for download on 17 December in an attempt to make Christmas No. 1 but, due to an error the wrong song was registered for chart inclusion, and therefore the song was disqualified from chart entry.

The third and final song to be released from the album, "Cities On Fire" was released in March 2008 as a part of the TwoByThree EP. The EP also featured the bands Baddies and The Ghost of a Thousand, both of whom accompanied Reuben on a nationwide tour in support of the EP.

2008-present: Hiatus
In June 2008 Reuben stopped recording and performing, and cancelled their planned July performance at the 2000 Trees Festival. Following the band's split, all three members went off into their own directions. Lenman stopped playing music for over a year to focus on his illustration work. However, after years of receiving letters from fans he was encouraged to get back into music which led to him releasing his debut solo album "Muscle Memory" in late 2013. Pearce and Davis however started the band Freeze the Atlantic and would go on to create 3 albums with that band before their eventual split in 2018.

On 24 July 2009, the Reuben website was updated to advertise a new rarities collection entitled We Should Have Gone To University. The collection, released in August 2009, contained every non-album track the band released as well as rare demos and session tracks. In addition there was a DVD containing the band's full set at 2007's Download Festival as well as interviews, documentaries and all of the band's music videos. The artwork for the collection was drawn by Lenman, and the collection was issued on Xtra Mile Recordings.

In June 2019, Guy Davis joined Lenman for his show at The Palm House in Belfast. He would then join Lenman as one of two of the touring drummers on Lenman's tour for his third solo album "Shuffle."

Los Skeletos
In 2005, the band members, under the name of Los Skeletos (A reference to the video for the band's single Freddy Kreuger) posted alternative recordings of Reuben songs on their music player. Los Skeletos played a string of gigs in the same year, playing some Reuben hits, but also new songs with which Reuben fans would be unfamiliar.

Members
Jamie Lenman - Guitar, vocals, piano/keyboard
Jon Pearce - Bass, backing vocals
Guy Davis - drums, backing vocals

Discography

References

External links
 
 Reuben interview from Room Thirteen
 Reuben MySpace page
We Should Have Gone To University Discography Page

British post-hardcore musical groups
English rock music groups
British musical trios
Musical groups established in 1998